

The Hillson Pennine was a 1930s United Kingdom two-seat cabin monoplane designed by Norman Sykes and built by F Hills & Sons of Trafford Park.

Design and development
The Pennine was a small high-wing braced monoplane powered by a  Praga B two-cylinder piston engine, though originally designed for an  Aspin engine. It was wooden-built and had fixed tailwheel landing gear. The Pennine, designed to be simple, had an unconventional control system with a normal elevator and spoilers on the leading edge of the mainplane, but had a fixed rudder with just a trim tab and no ailerons. Started in 1936 and completed in 1937 it was moved to Barton Aerodrome. The Penine became airborne during a high-speed taxi test on 4 February 1937, the controls had not been adjusted and it took Sykes half-an-hour of circling to the left to get down safely. The aircraft was not flown again, the company concentrating on a design for a trainer (the Hillson Helvellyn) and with space a premium for wartime work the Pennine was dismantled. The registration G-AFBX was cancelled on 19 November 1945.

Specifications

References

Notes

Bibliography

1930s British civil utility aircraft
High-wing aircraft
Aircraft first flown in 1937